Courtney Ozioma Dike (born 3 February 1995) is a footballer who plays as a forward. Born in the United States, she represents the Nigeria women's national football team at international level.

Career

College and amateur
Born in Edmond, Oklahoma, Courtney attended Edmond North High School and played college soccer at Oklahoma State University. In her four years at Edmond North High School, she scored over 90 goals.

She studied accounting at Oklahoma State University and played for the Oklahoma State University women's soccer team.

International career
In 2014, Courtney received a call up to represent the Nigerian U-20 national team for the 2014 FIFA U-20 Women's World Cup in Canada where she scored the fastest goal in the history of the competition after just 13 seconds in a match against North Korea. Her performance in the tournament earned her three nominations at the 2014 Nigeria Sports Award.

Courtney went on to represent Nigeria at the 2015 FIFA Women's World Cup in Canada. On 12 June 2015, she made history by becoming the first native Oklahoman to ever play in the World Cup after coming on for Asisat Oshoala in a match against Australia.

Personal life
She has two brothers, Bright and Daryl, and two sisters, Kimberly and Brittny. It was reported in the media that she rejected the bonus given to her for her role in the 2014 FIFA U-20 Women's World Cup. She explained in a letter sent to the Nigeria Football Federation that "I am delighted to play for Nigeria whenever called upon. I knew before leaving for the U-20 World Cup that I would not accept any bonuses. Acceptance of prize money is against NCAA regulations (the division 1 collegiate governing body) here in the US, so that is the main reason for rejecting it.".

Honours

International
FIFA U-20 Women's World Cup Runner-up: 2014

Individual

"All-City Player of the Year" (2013)

Awards and nominations

References

External links
 
  
 

1995 births
Living people
Citizens of Nigeria through descent
Nigerian women's footballers
Nigeria women's international footballers
2015 FIFA Women's World Cup players
Oklahoma State Cowgirls soccer players
Sportspeople from Edmond, Oklahoma
Soccer players from Oklahoma
American sportspeople of Nigerian descent
Women's association football forwards